The Wurzel Bush Folk Club is a not for profit music club which is held at The Rugby West Indian Social Club, Rugby, CV21 3HE on Tuesday Nights. Doors Open at 7pm. There is a warm-up session at about 7-30pm and the event starts dead on 8pm with the residents Crybb Folk. England, 
The club was opened by folk-comedian Dave Sampson on 19 February 1972. It soon outgrew its original venue at The Denbigh Arms, Monks Kirby so moved to the much larger room at The Fletch Hotel in Coventry where it successfully remained for some years. But even that venue with its 150 capacity was often sold out and on some occasions queues of over 150 people were waiting outside when the doors opened. This sort of popularity really pleased the brewery (Watneys) that they persuaded Sampson to open a Birmingham branch of The Wurzel Bush Folk Club at The Roebuck Ballroom at Erdington which had a capacity of over 400. The new venue was advertised by the brewery on Birmingham's new commercial radio station BRMB. The first night was packed out. With the Birmingham venue on a Friday night and the Coventry venue on the Saturday the club was often able to attract performers who normally only appeared in theatres. Jasper Carrott took advantage of this arrangement by recording his new album for DJM Records at both venues on consecutive nights. Giving an identical performance at both venues assisted editing. Jasper Carrott Rabbits On reached Number 5 in the album charts.  Due to pressure of work after 3 years Sampson dropped the Birmingham club as he was working in Middlesbrough during the week. He continued with the club running on a Saturday night but because of a disagreement with a new management moved the folk club to the White Lion at Brinklow where it remained for the next 12 years.

During those years meeting in the White Lions upstairs room, the club made international news after 6 ladies attended a performance by the Moulton Morris men when the took part in a fertility dance. Soon these ladies were pregnant. Central News sent the reporter John Swallow to report about the story for ITV. Sampson not only appeared on TV but on national radio and his song "In the club the traditional way" was played on a number of commercial radio news bulletins including Coventry's Mercia Sound. The News of the World told readers about this story on page 3 of their paper. In 1993 the folk club had to move from the White Lion after they turned the function room into bedrooms. For the next 15 years the club met at Brinklow Royal British Legion Club.

The club held a reunion event in August 2016., Subsequently, it restarted its weekly folk club events, again at the White Lion Inn in Brinklow, Warwickshire. In February 2017 the folk club moved to The Bulls Head In October 2018 the folk club moved to The Rugby West Indian Club. See the club's website www.wurzelbush.co.uk for the up to date programme.

References

English folk music
Music organisations based in the United Kingdom
Organizations established in 1972